The Apollo was a German automobile manufactured by Ruppe & Son of Apolda in Thuringia from 1910 to 1927; the company had previously offered a car called the Piccolo.  The first Apollo was called the "Mobbel", and featured an air-cooled 624cc single-cylinder ioe engine.  The company also offered air-cooled 1608 cc in-line fours and a 1575 cc V-4.  Four separate cylinders inline powered the model "E" (1770cc).  The model "B", designed by racing driver Karl Slevogt, had an ohv 960 cc four-cylinder engine.  Another of the designer's fine creations had an ohv 2040 cc engine.  Other Apollos had sv four-cylinder engines of up to 3440 cc; some post-1920 models featured wishbone suspension.  The last cars produced by the company had ohv 1200 cc four-cylinder engines; some had sv 1551 Steudel four-cylinder power units instead.  The famous designer of two-stroke engines, Hugo Ruppe, was the factory founder's son; in 1920 Apollo took over his air-cooled MAF cars.  During the mid-1920s, Slevogt raced cars of this marque with streamlined Jaray bodies.

Brass Era vehicles
Defunct motor vehicle manufacturers of Germany